Saline Township may refer to:

Arkansas
 Saline Township, Cleburne County, Arkansas, in Cleburne County, Arkansas
 Saline Township, Cleveland County, Arkansas, in Cleveland County, Arkansas
 Saline Township, Drew County, Arkansas, in Drew County, Arkansas
 Saline Township, Hempstead County, Arkansas, in Hempstead County, Arkansas
 Saline Township, Hot Spring County, Arkansas, in Hot Spring County, Arkansas
 Saline Township, Howard County, Arkansas, in Howard County, Arkansas
 Saline Township, Pike County, Arkansas, in Pike County, Arkansas
 Saline Township, Sevier County, Arkansas, in Sevier County, Arkansas

Illinois
 Saline Township, Madison County, Illinois

Michigan
 Saline Township, Washtenaw County, Michigan

Missouri
 Saline Township, Cooper County, Missouri
 Saline Township, Miller County, Missouri
 Saline Township, Perry County, Missouri
 Saline Township, Ralls County, Missouri
 Saline Township, Ste. Genevieve County, Missouri

North Dakota
 Saline Township, McHenry County, North Dakota, in McHenry County, North Dakota

Ohio
 Saline Township, Jefferson County, Ohio

Township name disambiguation pages